The New Bridge Polo and Country Club in Aiken, South Carolina is a polo facility.

History
In 2005 New Bridge Polo and Country Club and Langdon Road Polo Club combined.

References

External links

Sports venues in Aiken County, South Carolina
Polo clubs in the United States
Sports venues in South Carolina
1881 establishments in South Carolina